The Ukrainian Cup 1990 was the 25th edition of the Ukrainian SSR football knockout competition, known as the Ukrainian Cup. The competition started on May 11, 1990, and its final took place on October 28, 1990. It was the first edition of the tournament since it was discontinued back in 1976. The last year cup holder SKA Kiev was knocked out of the competition by Mayak Kharkiv already in the second round.

Polissya Zhytomyr entered the competition in the quarterfinals receiving bye past two rounds.

Teams

Tournament distribution
The competition was conducted by the clubs of 1991 Soviet Lower Second League, Zone 1 only.

Other professional teams
Many Ukrainian professional teams (18) in higher tiers of the Soviet football league pyramid did not take part in the competition.
 1990 Soviet Top League (5): FC Chornomorets Odesa, FC Dynamo Kyiv, FC Dnipro Dnipropetrovsk, FC Metalist Kharkiv, FC Shakhtar Donetsk
 1990 Soviet First League (2): FC Metalurh Zaporizhia, SC Tavriya Simferopol
 1990 Soviet Second League (11): FC Bukovyna Chernivtsi, FC Halychyna Drohobych, FC Karpaty Lviv, FC Kremin Kremenchuk, FC Nyva Ternopil, FC Nyva Vinnytsia, SKA Odessa, FC Volyn Lutsk, FC Vorskla Poltava, FC Zakarpattia Uzhhorod, FC Zorya Luhansk

Competition schedule

First round (1/16)
The first legs were played on 11 May, and the second legs were played on 22 May 1990.

|}

Notes
The following clubs received bye for the next round: Podillya Khmelnytskyi, Kryvbas Kryvyi Rih, Dynamo Bila Tserkva, Kolos Nikopol, Dnipro Cherkasy, Shakhtar Pavlohrad, SKA Kiev, Mayak Kharkiv, Zirka Kirovohrad, Desna Chernihiv.

Second round
The first legs were played on 11 June, and the second legs were played on 15 June 1990.

|}

Quarterfinals
Polissya Zhytomyr entered the competition. The first legs were played on 6 July, and the second legs were played on 28 July 1990.

|}

Semifinals
The first legs were played on 2 September, and the second legs were played on 26 September 1990.

|}

Final

The first leg was played on 18 October, and the second leg was played on 28 October 1990.

|}

First leg

Second leg

Polissya won 5–3 on aggregate

References

External links
 1991 Cup of the Ukrainian SSR
 Cup holders of the Ukrainian SSR

Football Cup of the Ukrainian SSR
Cup of the Ukrainian SSR
Ukrainian SSR